Saheb Rural District is a rural district (dehestan) in Ziviyeh District, Saqqez County, Kurdistan Province, Iran. At the 2006 census, its population was 4,845, in 995 families. The rural district has 24 villages.

References 

Rural Districts of Kurdistan Province
Saqqez County